Adam Christie is a Canadian stand-up comedian. He is most noted for his 2019 comedy album General Anxiety Disorder, which received a Juno Award nomination for Comedy Album of the Year at the Juno Awards of 2020.

He was the winner of SiriusXM's Canada's Top Comic competition in 2019, and has been a sketch comedy writer and story editor for This Hour Has 22 Minutes and Baroness von Sketch Show.

References

External links

21st-century Canadian comedians
Canadian stand-up comedians
Canadian male comedians
Comedians from Toronto
Canadian television writers
Living people
Writers from Toronto
Year of birth missing (living people)